Alexander Fyfe (1826 – 2 May 1903) was a Scottish-born settler of Victoria, Australia, who became a member of the Victorian Legislative Assembly, Victorian Legislative Council and the Queensland Legislative Assembly.

Early life
Fyfe was born in Scotland, the son of Jane Nicholson Bailliff. Fyfe emigrated to Australia, arriving in Melbourne in January 1848 aboard the Stag and settled in Geelong.

In Geelong, he was involved in the establishment of the:
 first building society
 the first bathing house
 the Geelong Chamber of Commerce
 the fire brigade
 a newspaper
 the Mechanic's Institute
 the first regatta (he owned four full-rigged vessels and chartered eleven more)

He was president of the:
 Mechanic's Institute
 the first cricket club in Victoria
 Geelong Agricultural Society
and a director/trustee of:
 the Geelong Botanic Gardens
 the Flinders State School
  the Geelong-Melbourne railway
and captain of the first volunteer regiment.

Alexander Fyfe was one of the first gold diggers at Ballarat. He was secretary of the Anti-Gold License Committee and contributed to legal expenses of the trial of Peter Lalor, the leader of the Eureka Rebellion

Politics

Fyfe was elected to the Victorian Legislative Council for Geelong in June 1854, a position he held until the original Council was abolished in 1856.

Fyfe was elected to the inaugural Victorian Legislative Assembly as one of the four members for Geelong in November 1856, a seat he held until resigning in November 1857 due to insolvency.

Fyfe moved to Queensland where he purchased a pastoral property from P. F. MacDonald near Peak Downs and became a pastoralist and auctioneer. He represented Rockhampton in the Queensland Legislative Assembly from 20 June 1870 to 24 November 1873.

Latter life

Fyfe returned to Melbourne around 1873 and died in Preston, Victoria on 2 May 1903.

References

 

1827 births
1903 deaths
History of Victoria (Australia)
Members of the Victorian Legislative Council
Members of the Victorian Legislative Assembly
Members of the Queensland Legislative Assembly
Scottish emigrants to colonial Australia
Australian auctioneers
19th-century Australian politicians
19th-century Australian businesspeople